Felicity Rose Hadley Jones (born 17 October 1983) is a British actress. She started her professional acting career as a child, appearing in The Treasure Seekers (1996) at age 12. She went on to play Ethel Hallow for one series of the television series The Worst Witch and its sequel Weirdsister College. On radio, she has played the role of Emma Grundy in the BBC's The Archers. In 2008, she appeared in the Donmar Warehouse production of The Chalk Garden.

Since 2006, Jones has appeared in the films Northanger Abbey (2007), Brideshead Revisited (2008), Chéri (2009), The Tempest (2010), The Amazing Spider-Man 2 (2014), and True Story (2015). Her performance in the 2011 film Like Crazy was met with critical acclaim and awards including a special jury prize at the 2011 Sundance Film Festival. Her performance as Jane Hawking in the 2014 biographical film The Theory of Everything earned her nominations for the BAFTA and Academy Award for Best Actress.

In 2016, Jones starred in the adventure-thriller Inferno, the fantasy drama A Monster Calls, and the space opera Rogue One: A Star Wars Story as Jyn Erso. She has since portrayed Ruth Bader Ginsburg in the biopic On the Basis of Sex (2018), and has starred in the streaming films The Aeronauts (2019), The Midnight Sky, and The Last Letter from Your Lover (2021).

Early life 
Felicity Rose Hadley Jones was born in Birmingham on 17 October 1983. She has one elder brother. Her mother worked in advertising and her father was a journalist. She grew up in Bournville. Her uncle Michael Hadley is also an actor, which prompted Jones's interest in acting as a child. One of her great-great-grandmothers was Italian and hailed from Lucca. After Kings Norton Girls' School, Jones attended King Edward VI Handsworth School, to complete A-levels and went on to take a gap year (during which she appeared in the BBC series Servants). She then read English at Wadham College, Oxford. She appeared in student plays, including Attis in which she played the titular role, and, in 2005, Shakespeare's The Comedy of Errors for the Oxford University Dramatic Society summer tour to Japan, starring alongside Harry Lloyd.

Career 
Jones began acting at the age of 11 at after-school workshop Central Junior Television, which was funded by Central Television. At age 14, she appeared in the first series of The Worst Witch. When Weirdsister College began in 2001, Jones returned as Hallow. Her longest running role around this time was on the BBC Radio 4 soap opera The Archers, where she played Emma Carter until 2009 (currently played by Emerald O'Hanrahan).

In 2003, she starred as Grace May in the BBC drama Servants. She took the leading role in the 2007 ITV adaptation of Jane Austen's Northanger Abbey, and starred in Polly Stenham's That Face at the Royal Court Theatre in April 2007.

In 2008, she appeared in the films Brideshead Revisited and Flashbacks of a Fool, the Doctor Who episode "The Unicorn and the Wasp" and a revival of Enid Bagnold's The Chalk Garden at the Donmar Warehouse theatre in London. In January 2009, the five-part TV serial The Diary of Anne Frank, in which Jones played the role of Margot Frank alongside Tamsin Greig (as Edith Frank-Holländer) and Iain Glen (as Otto Frank), was broadcast on BBC One. Later that year in May, she performed in a rehearsed reading of Anthony Minghella's Hang Up at the High Tide Festival. Jones played the role of Julie in Ricky Gervais and Stephen Merchant's 2010 film Cemetery Junction. She also appeared in Soulboy and in Julie Taymor's big screen adaptation of The Tempest as Miranda.

On 29 January 2011, Jones won a Special Jury Prize (Dramatic) at the Sundance Film Festival for her performance as Anna in Drake Doremus's Like Crazy. For the film, Jones did her own hair and make-up and improvised her dialogue. Her performance earned comparisons to Carey Mulligan's Academy Award-nominated role in An Education. She also received the Best New Hollywood Award for this film at the 2011 Hollywood Film Awards.

She appeared alongside Gossip Girl actor Ed Westwick in Chalet Girl, a romantic comedy released in March 2011, for which she had to undergo two months of snowboarding training and work undercover in a chalet at St Anton, scrubbing toilets and partying at the Krazy Kanguruh bar in preparation for the role. Jones said that the role was "something of a relief" after a string of costume roles and she was also keen to take on a comic role. Jones performed in Luise Miller, a new translation of Schiller's Kabale und Liebe by Mike Poulton at the Donmar Warehouse theatre in London, in June and July 2011. Jones lived with a Catholic family and attended Mass to prepare for the role. In 2011, Jones was announced as the new face of Burberry. In November, she was also announced as the new face of Dolce & Gabbana.

In 2013, Jones portrayed Ellen Ternan in The Invisible Woman. Jones, previously unfamiliar with Ternan, learned about her life through research, and reflected that she knew she was "in for a challenge" when choosing to work on the film, citing the experience of director Ralph Fiennes and how "methodically done" his performance was. She also co-starred in The Amazing Spider-Man 2, which was released on 2 May 2014. She played Felicia Hardy; an assistant of Harry Osborn. Jones signed on due to its difference from her previous works.

In 2014, Jones portrayed Jane Wilde Hawking in the film The Theory of Everything, a biopic charting the life and love between Wilde Hawking and the world-renowned physicist Stephen Hawking, with Eddie Redmayne starring as Hawking. After being given the script by her agent, Jones read it in its entirety in one sitting, and said that she enjoyed that it was a "love story and not a straightforward biopic." She auditioned for the film and its director, James Marsh, offered the part immediately after, surprising Jones who was accustomed to waiting several weeks for a confirmation. Jones was aided by Jane Hawking in preparing for the role, meeting with her. The film has been praised largely due to her and Redmayne's performances. Jane Hawking was so impressed by the portrayal she wondered if it was herself when watching Jones. For her role as Jane, she received widespread acclaim from a number of organisations, including nominations for an Academy Award for Best Actress, a BAFTA Award for Best Actress in a Leading Role, a Golden Globe Award for Best Actress, a Critics' Choice Movie Award for Best Actress and a Screen Actors Guild Award for Outstanding Performance by a Female Actor in a Leading Role.

In February 2015, she was cast as Jyn Erso in the Star Wars stand-alone film Rogue One, with Gareth Edwards directing. Jones's agent recommended the role to her, and she enjoyed the character's search for an identity, drawing inspiration in her movements from Ronda Rousey. The film was released in December 2016 to positive reviews and grossed over $1 billion at the box office. Also in 2016, Jones starred in Inferno, playing a doctor aiding Robert Langdon in his escape. After agreeing to the role, she visited museums and galleries to understand her character better. Jones enjoyed the chemistry between her and Tom Hanks's characters as well as Inferno'''s overall diversity.

In late 2018, Jones starred in On the Basis of Sex, a biography of United States Supreme Court Justice Ruth Bader Ginsburg, directed by Mimi Leder and co-starring Armie Hammer and Justin Theroux. She then reunited on-screen with Redmayne in the biographical adventure The Aeronauts (2019), joined George Clooney in Netflix's science fiction film The Midnight Sky (2020), and starred in the romantic drama The Last Letter from Your Lover (2021), an adaptation of Jojo Moyes' 2012 novel of the same name.

Upcoming projects
Jones will next star in the thriller Borderland, alongside Aml Ameen, Mark Strong and Sophia Brown. In May 2022, it was announced that she will lead Simon Amstell's comedy Maria'', co-starring Jonathan Bailey.

Personal life 
Jones met artist Ed Fornieles at Oxford when he was at the Ruskin School of Art, and they dated from 2003 to 2013.

In 2015, Jones was in a relationship with director Charles Guard. They became engaged in May 2017, and married in June 2018. In December 2019, a representative for Jones confirmed the couple were expecting their first child. Their son was born in April 2020.

Filmography

Awards and nominations

Notes

References

External links 

 
 

1983 births
20th-century British actresses
21st-century British actresses
Actresses from Birmingham, West Midlands
Alumni of Wadham College, Oxford
British child actresses
British feminists
British film actresses
English people of Italian descent
British radio actresses
British stage actresses
British television actresses
British voice actresses
Living people
People educated at King Edward VI Handsworth
People of Tuscan descent